Siding may refer to:

 Siding (construction), the outer covering or cladding of a house
 Siding (rail), a track section

See also
 

fr:Parement
nl:Parement